Retrospectacle – The Supertramp Anthology, also known as Gold in the U.S., is the first comprehensive compilation album by the English rock band Supertramp, released in October 2005.

Overview
As Supertramp's first career retrospective, Retrospectacle contains a compilation of the most popular songs, live tracks and favourite album tracks from all of their albums from Supertramp to Slow Motion, including the live albums Paris and It Was the Best of Times. It was released as either a single disc or a double album.

Also, Retrospectacle marks the first appearance on an album of the single "Land Ho" and its B-side "Summer Romance". The version of "Land Ho" used on the compilation is the 1975 remix which the band intended to use on Crisis? What Crisis? but left off at the last minute, while "Summer Romance" is the original mix from the single.  "Land Ho" was later rerecorded by Roger Hodgson for his 1987 solo album Hai Hai (with new lyrics).

Classic Rock ranked Retrospectacle the 12th greatest compilation album of 2005.

Track listing
All songs are written by Rick Davies and Roger Hodgson, except where noted.

Single Disc Edition

Two Disc Edition

Disc one

Disc two

Production
Compilation producers: Rick Davies, Bill Levenson
Producers: Supertramp, Ken Scott, Peter Henderson, Jay Messina, Jack Douglas, David Kershenbaum and Rick Davies.
Mastering: Greg Calbi, Jay Messina
Art Direction: Richard Frankel, Vartan.
Cover Art: Bruno Budrovic

Charts

Weekly charts

Year-end charts

Certifications

References

2005 compilation albums
A&M Records compilation albums
Albums produced by Ken Scott
Supertramp compilation albums
Albums recorded at Trident Studios
Albums recorded at A&M Studios
Albums recorded at United Western Recorders
Albums recorded at Morgan Sound Studios